

Trappeto (Trappitu in Sicilian) is an Italian municipality of 3,123 inhabitants in the Metropolitan City of Palermo, located in the north-west part of Sicily. It is part of the metropolitan area of Palermo.

It is a seaside resort on the coast in the Gulf of Castellammare. The city was founded in the 15th century. Frederick II of Aragon used it as part of his hunting grounds. From this, Trappeto evolved as a fertile agricultural centre.  The main sources of income for the town include fishing and tourism. Known as "Trappetum cannamelarum", for the mill of the Sugar cane which was planted here in 1480 by the rich landowner Francis Bologna, who subsequently made a fortune during the 16th century.

In early 1600 it was abandoned by its inhabitants, but was later returned to and repopulated at the end of 1700 for cultivating grapes for wine. Stable population took hold in the early 19th century, thanks to houses built around the old Church of the Annunciation. The city is famous for the work of activist, Danilo Dolci, a  social and cultural writer who helped bring Trappeto back from depths of poverty and ruin.  He established an orphanage in Trappeto. Trappeto is also famous for its beaches, with the most popular being Ciammarita

The beach Ciammarita is a spit of sand a few hundred metres long, overlooking the Mediterranean Sea.  It is known to be capricious, and among the windiest places in Italy. It is reachable from Trapani taking exit "Partinico-Trappeto" from State Highway 113. Ciammarita is not far from the town of Trappeto, making walking to the beach a very popular choice for both tourists and residents.

Demographic evolution

References

Municipalities of the Metropolitan City of Palermo